The Party Boys is the self-titled sole debut album by Australian rock band the Party Boys. Tracks 2, 4, 5 and 8 were originals, the rest of the songs are covers, originally recorded by (in order): Argent, John Kongos, Them, the Angels, La De Da's and AC/DC, however "It Could Have Been You" was originally released by Party Boy's lead singer John Swan as a single in 1985.

Track listing
"Hold Your Head Up"
"Is This the Way to Say Goodbye"
"He's Gonna Step on You Again"
"She's a Mystery"
"Rising Star"
"Gloria"
"Small Talk"
"It Could've Been You"
"Gonna See My Baby"
"High Voltage"

Personnel
 John Swan - lead vocals
 Kevin Borich - lead guitar, backing vocals; lead vocals on "Gonna See My Baby"
 John Brewster - rhythm guitar, backing vocals; guitar solo on "Rising Star"
 Alan Lancaster - bass, backing vocals; lead vocals on "Could've Been You"
 Paul Christie - drums, backing vocals
 Richard Harvey - drums
 Chris Turner - guitar solo on "She's a Mystery"

1987 debut albums
The Party Boys albums